Johannes Marius ("Bok") de Korver (27 January 1883 in Rotterdam – 22 October 1957 in Rotterdam) was a football player from the Netherlands, who twice won a bronze medal with the Netherlands national football team at the Summer Olympics: in 1908 (London) and in 1912 (Stockholm).

Career

De Korver played for Sparta Rotterdam between 1902 and 1923. He won the Dutch national title five times. De Korver scored his most notable goal in 1912, in a match against AFC Ajax. His goal won Sparta the national title.

De Korver played 31 caps for the Netherlands between 1905 and 1913, scoring two goals. He won two Olympic bronze medals, in 1908 and 1912. De Korver captained the latter team. He was also a player of the Dutch national team that beat England for the first time ever, in 1913.

Bok de Korver was a civil servant for the municipality of Rotterdam. He ended his career at age 40, after pneumonia. De Korver died on 22 October 1957, aged 74. He was buried in Haren (Groningen).

De Korver was an honorary member of Sparta and of the Royal Dutch Football Association. The football club BDK from Amsterdam was named after De Korver. The west stand of Sparta's stadium, Het Kasteel, was renamed Bok de Korver Stand on 1 April 2007.

Career statistics

International

International goals
''Scores and results table. Netherlands's goal tally first:

References

  Dutch Olympic Committee

External links
 Bok de Korver - International Appearances at RSSSF.com
  Profile at voetbal.com

1883 births
1957 deaths
Dutch footballers
Directors of football clubs in the Netherlands
Sparta Rotterdam players
Netherlands international footballers
Footballers at the 1908 Summer Olympics
Footballers at the 1912 Summer Olympics
Olympic footballers of the Netherlands
Olympic bronze medalists for the Netherlands
Footballers from Rotterdam
Olympic medalists in football
Medalists at the 1912 Summer Olympics
Medalists at the 1908 Summer Olympics
Association football midfielders